The 1990–91 South Western Football League season was the 40th in the history of South Western League. The league consisted of 17 teams.

Stadia and locations

League table

The division featured 17 teams, all from last season.

References

9